I Love You Only (Italian: Amo te sola) is a 1935 Italian historical drama film directed by Mario Mattoli and starring Milly, Vittorio De Sica and Giuditta Rissone.

It was shot at the Cines Studios in Rome. The film's sets were designed by the art director Gastone Medin.

Synopsis
The film is set in Florence in 1848, then the capital of the Grand Duchy of Tuscany in the era before Italian unification. A young Neapolitan composer arrives in the city and becomes involved with Italian patriots, planning to take part in the Revolutions that year.

Cast
Milly as Grace 
Vittorio De Sica as  Prof. Giovanni Agano 
Enrico Viarisio as Avvocato Piccoli 
Giuditta Rissone as  Aunt Giuditta 
Renato Cialente as  Baron 
Ada Dondini as  Carlotta 
Giovanni Barrella as  Cavaliere Rivolta 
Enzo Biliotti as  Opera Manager 
Carlo Ninchi as  Cesare Baldi 
Guglielmo Sinaz   
Emilio Cigoli

References

Bibliography
 Goble, Alan. The Complete Index to Literary Sources in Film. Walter de Gruyter, 1999.
 Mancini, Elaine. Struggles of the Italian Film Industry During Fascism, 1930-1935. UMI Research Press, 1985.

External links

1935 films
Italian black-and-white films
1930s Italian-language films
Films directed by Mario Mattoli
Films set in Florence
Films set in the 1840s
Italian historical drama films
1930s historical drama films
Cines Studios films
1935 drama films